Major General Walter Lee Miller Jr. is a retired senior officer in the United States Marine Corps.

Military career
Miller graduated from Texas A&M University and was commissioned a 2nd lieutenant in December 1979 via the Naval Reserve Officer Training Corps program. He completed The Basic School (TBS) and Infantry Officer's Course in October 1980 and was assigned to B Company, 1st Battalion, 3rd Marines. There he served as commander for both rifle and weapons platoons, as well as the B Company Executive Officer. He was later assigned to the battalion's operations section completing his tour in October 1983. His next assignment was to TBS where he held both Staff Platoon Commander and tactics instructor billets from 1983 to 1986.

Following this assignment he was ordered to the Amphibious Warfare School (AWS) where he graduated with honors, as well as being chosen as the ground honor graduate, earning the Captain Larry K. Shipman award.

Following AWS he returned to the operating force in 1987 until 1991, and was assigned as C Company Commander in 1st Battalion, 6th Marine Regiment. During this tour he deployed to Okinawa and later to the Republic of Panama in support of Freedom of Movement in the Canal Zone under Marine Forces Panama. He also served as the Regiment's Assistant Operations Officer and later as Commander of the UNITAS Rifle Company. Following his return from UNITAS he was sent to Incirlik, Turkey as a liaison officer in support of Provide Comfort.

Miller's next assignment was to Plans, Policies, and Operations; Special Operations and Low Intensity Conflict; Headquarters Marine Corps from 1991-1994. He then was sent to Command and Staff College, Quantico, Virginia. Following Command and Staff College, he was assigned to Marine Forces South Liaison Element in the Republic of Panama from 1995-1998. There he served as the G5, later as the G3 and finally as the Officer In Charge.

Following Panama, Brigadier General Miller returned to Second Marine Division in 1998 until 2003. During this tour he served as the G3 Operations Officer, 2nd Marine Regiment's Executive Officer and finally as Commanding Officer of Battalion Landing Team 2nd Battalion, 2nd Marine Regiment (BLT 2/2). During BLT 2/2's deployment, they participated in operations in Kosovo, Djibouti and finally went ashore in March 2003 in support of Operation Iraqi Freedom I.

Upon completion of this tour with 2nd Battalion, 2nd Marine Regiment he was posted as the Chief of Staff of 4th Marine Division in 2003. He then was ordered, in 2004, to report to III Marine Expeditionary Forces, Marine Forces Pacific in order to take command of 31st Marine Expeditionary Unit (MEU) and again was deployed to Iraq for Operation Iraqi Freedom II where the MEU took charge of the AO Denver (Western Al Anbar) Operating Area. Upon return the MEU was deployed in a humanitarian aid/disaster relief mission to Leyte, the Philippines, to support efforts following their disastrous mountain mud slide.

In 2006 Miller was assigned as the Assistant Chief of Staff of United States European Command and held that billet until reassignment to Headquarters, Marine Corps Combat Development Command in 2008. He served as Director of the Joint Capabilities Assessment and Integration Directorate, the Marine Corps representative to the Joint Capabilities Board. In June 2009, he was assigned as the Director of Capabilities Development Directorate.

Major general Walter Lee Miller Jr. retired from the active service on July 14, 2017 at Camp Lejeune, North Carolina. He was decorated with Navy Distinguished Service Medal at his retirement ceremony.

Awards
Major General Miller's awards include the Defense Superior Service Medal, Legion of Merit with Gold Star, Bronze Star Medal with "V", Defense Meritorious Service Medal, Meritorious Service Medal with Gold Star, Navy Commendation Medal with Gold Star and the Navy Achievement Medal. Miller has a master's degree in Curriculum Design.

Personal life
Miller is married to the former Marcela Davila and has three daughters and four grandchildren.

References

United States Marine Corps personnel of the Iraq War
United States Marine Corps personnel of the War in Afghanistan (2001–2021)
Living people
United States Marine Corps generals
Recipients of the Navy Distinguished Service Medal
Recipients of the Defense Superior Service Medal
Recipients of the Legion of Merit
Year of birth missing (living people)